Castle Rock High School is a rural public high school in Castle Rock, Washington.

Academics 
14% of Castle Rock students take an Advanced Placement (AP) exam, with 2% passing the AP exam. 18% of Castle Rock students are proficient in math and 55% are proficient in reading. Castle Rock is well below the state median both graduation rates and proficiency scores.

Castle Rock has a graduation rate of 80%.

Demographics 

Castle Rock is a predominantly white high school, with 79% of its students considering themselves white. The two other most popular racial/ethinc groups are Hispanic and Two or more races.

47% of students are female, and 53% are male. 47% are economically disadvantaged, with 48% forming part of the free or reduced lunch programs.

Sports
Castle Rock is a member of the Washington Interscholastic Activities Association (WIAA) and competes in the Southwest Washington District 4 Trico 1A league.   The Trico 1A consists of eight teams.

State championships
 Baseball: 1988
 Boys Basketball: 1932, 1969
 Boys Track: 1983, 1985, 1990, 1991
 Boys Wrestling: 1984, 1985
 Football: 1988
 Softball: 2007, 2010
 Volleyball: 1987, 1993, 2013

State runners-up
 Baseball: 1987
 Boys Track: 1974, 1975, 1984
 Boys Wrestling: 1981, 1982
 Girls Basketball: 1982, 2013
 Softball: 2008, 2009
 Volleyball: 1983, 2008, 2011

Notable people
 Benji Radach - mixed martial arts fighter

References

High schools in Cowlitz County, Washington
Schools accredited by the Northwest Accreditation Commission
Public high schools in Washington (state)